Ayres is Keith Kenniff's third album under his Helios moniker. This is the only Helios album that contains vocals.  There is also a remastered, instrumental version of "Ayres".

Track listing

References

2007 albums
Keith Kenniff albums